Camp Lisa is a children's album by Lisa Loeb. The album features 19 children's camp songs, such as "Home on the Range", "Peanut Butter & Jelly", and "The Cookie Jar Chant". It was recorded and released in June 2008. It features a cover of the song "Ready for the Summer" from the film, Meatballs.

Track listing
"Ready for the Summer" (Elmer Bernstein / Norman Gimbel)
"Going Away" (Lisa Loeb / Michelle Lewis / Dan Petty)
"Woodchuck #1"
"Wake Up Song" (Loeb / Lewis / Petty)
"Best Friend" (Loeb / Lewis / Petty)
"Granma's in the Cellar"
"The Disappointing Pancake" (Loeb / Lewis / Petty)
"Woodchuck #2"
"Home on the Range" (Brewster Higley VI / Daniel E. Kelley)
"Father Abraham"
"Woodchuck #3"
"Love Is a Rose" (Neil Young)
"Peanut Butter and Jelly"
"When It Rains" (Loeb / Lewis / Petty)
"Cookie Jar Chant"
"Cookie Jar Song"
"H.A.P.P.Y."
"It's Not Goodbye" (Loeb / Lewis / Petty)
"Linger"

Personnel
 Leland Sklar – bass
 Steve Martin – banjo
 Jay Bellerose – drums, percussion
 Jill Sobule – vocals, banjo
 Doug Petty – piano, Wurlitzer piano, Wurlitzer organ
 Maia Sharp – vocals
 Michelle Lewis – vocals, kazoo
 Dan Petty – vocals, guitar, acoustic guitar, mandolin, ukulele, tambourine
 Lisa Loeb – vocals, acoustic guitar

References 

2008 albums
Children's music albums by American artists
Lisa Loeb albums